Neil Jon Pullen (born 14 September 1977) is an English cricketer.  Pullen is a right-handed batsman who bowls right-arm medium pace and who occasionally plays as a wicketkeeper.  He was born in Leicester, Leicestershire.

Pullen represented the Leicestershire Cricket Board in List A cricket.  His debut List A match came against Hertfordshire in the 1999 NatWest Trophy.  From 1999 to 2002, he represented the Board in 7 List A matches, the last of which came against the Kent Cricket Board in the 2nd round of the 2003 Cheltenham & Gloucester Trophy which was played in 2002.

In his 7 List A matches, he scored 225 runs at a batting average of 37.50, with 2 half centuries and a high score of 88.  In the field he took 5 catches.  With the ball he took 21 wickets at a bowling average of 12.71, with a single five wicket haul which gave him best figures of 5/41. He therefore finished his List A career with better batting and bowling averages than Sir Ian Botham.

He currently plays club cricket for Sileby Town CC in the Leicestershire Premier Cricket League.

References

External links
Neil Pullen at Cricinfo
Neil Pullen at CricketArchive

1977 births
Living people
Cricketers from Leicester
English cricketers
Leicestershire Cricket Board cricketers